Nikolay Malinka ( ‘Mykola Malynka’; February 16, 1913 – December 14, 1993) was a Ukrainian painter, creative artist, and sculptor. He was among those who studied and worked in the Soviet Union where Socialist Realism became a state policy, but is often considered a representative of Ukrainian impressionism as well.  Focused on the dramatic depictions of Soviet and Ukrainian history, Nikolay Malinka produced canvases of Ukrainian Cossack's quest for peace and freedom, portrayed prominent personalities of the past and present day, composed a brief history of his homeland - Yahotyn county of Kyiv Region. Later, when Gorbachev's glasnost’ effectively ended state censorship, he began to reveal on the canvas Ukrainian national tragedies, such as the forcible collectivization and the Great Famine (Holodomor) of 1933, which took millions of Ukrainian lives.

Early life 

Nikolay Malinka was born in small village, Lisniaky, and spent his childhood side by side with picturesque beauty of historical Poltava Governorate (Guberniia) of Dnieper Ukraine (with time, Lisniaky became a part of the county-seat Yahotyn of Kyiv Region).

No sooner out of the cradle, the boy started to paint his surroundings. It seemed nobody took seriously a young talent except a local artist and photographer L. Briummer, who persistently advised him to take professional courses. Instead, under parental pressure, Nikolay Malinka entered, in 1929, the horticultural school but soon dropped out. Then, he became a student of the book department of the Kharkiv cooperative technical college. 
The city was a significant cultural center of Soviet Ukraine. The young man read a lot, visited museums and exhibitions, met prominent people and gradually came to a final decision to become an artist.

In the fall of 1933, he enrolled in Kyiv Art Institute where he had been studying fine art and graphics for several years. In the middle of his studies he was drafted into the army and served in the unit located in Moscow. Being always on the lookout of a new possibility to continue education, Nikolay Malinka very soon became a student of the fine art studio that is now the internationally renowned Moscow's Grekov Studio of Battle-Scene Artists. His training was led by the talented masters of Soviet war art whose idea was to promote the Red Army heroic past by a new cohort of artists. 
Among them were Khrystophor Ushenin, Vasyl’ Swarog, Yevhen Katsman, Oleksander Herasymov.  
By the end of 1939, Soviet mainstream newspaper “Pravda” (“The Truth”) recognized Nikolay Malinka as one of the best students who had good understanding of the color palette and composition. [1]

His education was supplemented with Grekov Studio's team expeditions to the Caucasian Region of the country which resulted in several artworks of the socialist realism style. Thus, the gallery of the future artist was started (and overtime increased in size), and first recognition soon followed: Caucasian theme canvases by Nikolay Malynka were exhibited at the Central House of the Soviet Army and honored with the certificate of the heroic deed (gramota) of the Moscow Military District.

WWII (1939-1945): Personal impact and career 
The wartime brought destruction in Europe's fallen countries, and political confusion for many of Nikolay Malinka's countrymen. At this time, Malinka's temporary location was city of Kosiv, which is part of Ivano-Frankivs’k Region in West Ukraine at the present time. Following the order of Soviet authorities, he was in charge of creating a local School of Applied Arts. Meanwhile, the artist's spirit was captured by the beauty of Carpathians, rich ethnos, folklore and memories of long ago. Later, in postwar times, he will produce several masterpieces sunken in Carpathians spirit, such as “Arcan, the Gutsul’s Dance” (1957), “On Upper Reaches of Carpathians” (1959), “The Gutsul’s fair” (1970) and many others.

Shortly before the German occupation, Malinka returned to his homeland, the Yahotyn county of Kyiv Region; because of two members of the family who were sick, his family required him to stay by its side. Released from the draft due to his own illness, he worked at the local railway station. But with Nazis in town, he wasn’t able to continue his work. Many intellectuals, including Malinka and his family, which completely depended on him, survived two long years under Nazis, working hard at their private vegetable patches.

One day he was imprisoned but was fortunate enough to escape from a freight train headed to Germany. When German forces were driven out of the area (fall of 1943) by the Red Army, he became enlisted in 209th battalion of the 8th Air Army and found himself on the front lines of the 2nd Ukrainian Front.
Malinka's postwar life was typical for Soviet intellectuals. To make a living for his family, he painted Soviet slogans, placards, posters, etc. At any cost, he tried to be incorporated into mainstream cultural postwar process but had no luck. Meanwhile, a small-town-artist made several efforts to brush into canvas wartime memories. The picture “Babi Yar” and several others were exhibited in Kyiv, the capital of Ukraine. Soon after, in 1949, he became a member of All-Soviet Union of Artists and, in a few years, of Kyiv Artist Society (which became later a part of All-Union Art Foundation). Those Kievans significantly influenced his style and shaped his artistry in a new way. Soon Malinka found himself at a stylistic turning point: features of socialist realism disappeared and his impressionistic style began to develop.

His best pieces entered all-Union and all-Ukraine exhibitions. At one of these exhibitions the picture “Arcan, the Gutsul’s Dance” was bought by the Ministry of Culture of Ukraine; another similar work, “On Upper Reaches of Carpathians” (1959), was taken to Australia by an art collector. It was a big achievement.

Artworks overview 
A typical Malinka's subject is Ukraine. Thematically, works belong to several groups, such as: Ukrainian history; the village of the Soviet epoch (which include portraiture); picturesque Ukrainian landscapes; and still life.  Sometimes it is a whole story behind the canvas (such as “A Zaporozhian Hut at Supper”, “Kobzars” or “The Total Collectivization”), and sometimes his set-ups are simple, incorporating at most a tree, or an old hut, or a tractor on the collective farm's field.  As usual, his simple pictures (such as “The Parental Hut”, “The Stacks under Snow”, “The Windmills”, and others) are painted in narrowed color palette; this is combined with a colorful imagination and a skillful brush, which obviously helps to create glowing masterpieces.

Compositionally truthful are paintings with his native Dnieper Ukraine depicted as a slope of blooming buckwheat, or the folk girls dance on the grass, or egrets seeking food on the harvested field, or children, happily boating. Mastering everyday life topics, Malinka widely used his knowledge of the history and ethnography, and it worked in many ways. He copied a famous icon of notable Russian master of murals Mikhail Vrubel’ “The Virgin and Child”, dated 1884; it is a part of interior decoration of St. Cyril's Church in Kyiv, Ukraine.

As for his still life group of paintings, it seems enough just to see his “Sunflowers” to realize that the subject of Van Gogh's famous painting has another talented approach—that of Malinka.
There are some paintings in Malinka's collection which reflect an artist's affection for the prominent figures of Ukrainian cause. Taras Shevchenko, the Ukrainian poet-thinker and artist, is among them. The paintings of the poet, visiting on several occasions, illustrate Malinka's hometown history at the Yahotyn State Historical Museum and are in the holdings of the Taras H. Shevchenko Museum, Toronto, Canada. The bust of Shevchenko by self-taught sculptor and architect Nykolay Malinka is incorporated into local historical landscape of the city of Yahotyn since 1959. It was his first try in a totally new field – sculpture.  While not his last one: the streets and parks of Yahotyn later gained other monuments of his hand; he also created some reliefs as a part of monumental structures.  As a master of mosaic, he made a beautiful frontal exterior wall for the city's movie theater, depicting a people's quest for a peace.

The artist painted panoramic canvases illustrating prehistoric human life which can be seen in the archaeological museum in the village Dobranichevka, Yagotinian region, Ukraine.

His own house, workshop and his children's houses are perfect examples of the ornamental mosaic with a hint of Ukrainian folk encounter; they serve as a part of local landmarks since the 1970s.

Famous people painted 
 Petro Konashevych-Sahaidachny - Hetman of Registered Cossacks (1616–1622)
 Bohdan Khmelnytsky - Hetman of Ukraine (1648 — 1657)
 Petro Doroshenko - 4th Hetmans of Ukrainian Cossacks (1665 – 1676)
 Ivan Mazepa - Hetman of Cossack Ukraine (ca. 1639 -1709)
 Pavlo Polubotok - Hetman of Cossack Ukraine (ca.1660 -1724)
 Kyrylo Rozumovs’kyi - Hetman of Cossack Ukraine (1728-1803)
 Taras Shevchenko - Ukrainian poet-democrat, artist, philosopher and humanist (1814-1861)
 Katheryna Bilokur - self-taught artist, National Artist of Ukraine (1900 -1961)

Legacy 
Nikolay Malinka was one of those artists who proved that great art can be created in small towns and villages as well. Thanks to the artists of his kind, Ukrainian art reached international standards and continues to keep abreast with the latest field developments.

Malinka left behind more than 300 paintings, sketches, drawings of realist and impressionist style, mostly oils and partially watercolors. Majority are displayed in museums and galleries of his homeland – Yahotyn and villages of the Yahotyn county; some are spread worldwide, including Ukraine and its capital Kyiv, as often happens with an art of a great significance.

Some of them present a good educational material, such as “The Soviet Tanks T-34 Forcing Desna River at Liutizh Area” (which is a good example of dynamic painting learned and polished in Grekov Studio) or panoramic panels, on a topic of prehistoric village primitive life, which are exhibited at the Dobranichevka Archeological Museum, of Yahotyn County. Notable historical city of Pereiaslav, of Kyiv Region, has in its possession another Malinka's famous work of the same matter - “Kobzars”; reproductions of this artwork became a part of Woscob Private Art Gallery (Pennsylvania, USA) and Yahotyn Art Gallery.  Some “little pearls” from landscape series – “The Summer” (1963) and “The Stalks under Snow” (1961) – are long gone to Switzerland's Zürich collection. And there are Australia, the Netherlands, and other foreign countries in the listings.

Nikolay Malinka's performance in artistry and Ukrainian cultural rebirth was honored, in 1990, with a title “The Honorable Citizen of Yahotyn City”.  As a tribute to Malinka's humble and highly talented personality, Ukrainian National Television Company UT-1 aired in 1993 a short biographical documentary.

References 

[1] http://www.grekovstudio.ru/about/history/1934/ - Newspaper Pravda, Moscow, Dec. 7, 1939 (in Russian)//Retrieved on October 12, 2013

Further reading 
 Helen Smindak. Dateline New York: A spiritual launching for earthly delights, ”The Ukrainian Weekly”, December 13, 1998, No.50, Vol.LXVI
 Ika Koznarska Casanova. Woskob Private Collection includes works by 17 artists, “The Ukrainian Weekly”, May 16, 2004, No.20, Vol.LXXII
 Nikolai Malinka in The Catalog of Moscow’s Grekov Studio of Battle-Scene Artists, Moscow, 1984//Retrieved on December 5, 2012
 Nikolai Malinka in The Register of Professional Artists of the Russian Empire, USSR, “Russian Émigrés”, Russian Federation and Republics of the Former Soviet Union (18th – 21thc.)//Retrieved on December 11, 2012

External links 
 Malinka Nikolay — personal site
 Wikimedia Commons
 The Honorable Citizens of Yahotyn City
 Arts Gallery
 The Taras H. Shevchenko Museum and Memorial Park Foundation, Toronto, Canada
 The Museums of Yahotyn County 
 The Yahotyn Art Gallery
 The Yahotyn State Historical Museum

1913 births
1993 deaths
Soviet artists
Ukrainian artists
People from Poltava Governorate